MLW Fusion is a professional wrestling television program produced by Major League Wrestling (MLW) that originally premiered on April 20, 2018 on beIN Sports USA. On November 10, 2022, the series began streaming on Pro Wrestling TV.

A thirteen-part mini-series, titled MLW Fusion: Alpha (stylized as MLW Fusion: ALPHA), aired from September 22 to December 16, 2021. It would be followed by a second mini-series, MLW Azteca, which aired from Thursday January 6, 2022, to February 3, 2022.

History

2018–2020
Major League Wrestling announced their partnership with beIN Sports on March 30, 2018, in which the network would air a weekly television series. Subsequently, MLW announced their television tapings would take place at Gilt Nightclub in Orlando, Florida. MLW Fusion would air on Friday nights beginning on April 20, 2018. On September 19, it was announced that MLW signed a deal for the show to be streamed through FITE TV, and to air on beIN Sports in Spanish.

On November 29, it was announced that Fusion would be broadcast live for the first time on its December 14 episode, during MLW's Zero Hour event. Since then the company would continue to air periodic live specials.

In January 2019, Fusion added its first international broadcast partner, EGO TV in Israel. In February 2019, MLW announced that Fusion would be moving from Friday to Saturday nights.

After the conclusion of the MLW vs AAA Super Series on the May 9, 2020 episode, Fusion would go on a hiatus due to the COVID-19 pandemic. A spinoff series, titled Pulp Fusion, was uploaded weekly on MLW's YouTube channel in the interim beginning on May 29, 2020.

"The Restart" and Fusion: Alpha (2020–2021)

On September 10, MLW announced that Fusion would move to Wednesday nights on fubo Sports Network. On October 10, it was revealed that Fusion would return on November 18 at 7pm EST and new episodes would also premiere on MLW's YouTube channel on the same night. With the move to YouTube and Fubo Sports, Fusion abandoned its original year-round, weekly format; a special "season finale" aired on May 5, 2021.

During the premiere of Battle Riot III on July 24, 2021, MLW announced a new season of Fusion to air on "a new home" in the Fall, and a new, four-part mini-series titled MLW Fusion: Alpha (stylized as MLW Fusion: ALPHA) to lead into the new season. Initially announced to air in August, Fusion: Alpha was later re-announced on September 6, 2021, as "a new season and series from MLW" to premiere on September 22 on MLW's YouTube channel, and would also air on Saturdays and Mondays on Bein Sports. Beginning October 19, 2021, Fusion: Alpha would also stream on FITE TV. 

On December 7, MLW announced that the series finale of Fusion: Alpha will air on December 15, 2021, though the final episode would instead air on December 16. MLW also announced a new "anthology mini-series" titled MLW Azteca, which was taped during the MLW Azteca/The Crash show in December 2021. The series premiered on Thursday January 6, 2022 on MLW's YouTube channel and FITE TV, and aired for five episodes.

2022–present
 
During the January 27, 2022 episode of MLW Azteca, it was announced that MLW Fusion would return for a new season on February 10. On the June 23 episode, it was announced that the current season would end with the Kings of Colosseum special on July 14, 2022. During the finale, it was announced that Fusion would return for a new season in the Fall.

On October 11, 2022, MLW announced a partnership with streaming platform Pro Wrestling TV (PWTV), bringing the promotion's programming library to the service beginning November 3. The new season of Fusion premiered on PWTV on November 10.

On January 20, 2023, MLW announced a broadcast deal with U.S cable channel Reelz to produce a new flagship show titled MLW Underground Wrestling, which premiered on February 7 and featured matches and segments that were originally taped for Fusion. Following its premiere, Bein Sports ceased airing Fusion in the U.S. and Fusion'''s February 9, 2023 episode would be postponed.

Production
Filming locations
Initially, Fusion had been taped at Gilt Nightclub in Orlando, Florida. In May 2018, MLW announced they would be holding television tapings at the Melrose Ballroom in New York City, New York on July 19, marking the first time tapings were held outside the state of Florida. Subsequent tapings have been held at various venues around the United States.

From Fall 2020 until 2021, due to the COVID-19 pandemic, MLW would return to Gilt Nightclub to tape their programming behind closed doors. From July to December 2021, MLW programming was taped at the 2300 Arena from the promotion's home base in Philadelphia, Pennsylvania.

Special episodes

Roster

The wrestlers featured on Major League Wrestling take part in scripted feuds and storylines. Wrestlers are portrayed as either villains or heroes in the scripted events that build tension and culminate in a wrestling match.

Commentators

 Broadcast history MLW Fusion originally aired on Friday nights in the United States on BeIN Sports. In February 2019, the show moved to Saturday nights. 

On November 18, 2020, new episodes of Fusion moved to Wednesday nights on fubo Sports Network and MLW's YouTube channel, with BeIN Sports now airing replays on Saturday nights.

With the premiere of MLW Azteca on January 6, 2022, MLW programming moved to Thursdays nights on YouTube; Fusion would return on February 10 of that year.

On November 10, 2022, MLW Fusion moved to Pro Wrestling TV, continuing to air on Thursday nights. Bein Sports would drop the series in the U.S after re-airing the February 2, 2023 episode.

 International 
In addition to the U.S., MLW Fusion also airs on BeIN Sports in Canada and Puerto Rico. As of 2022, Fusion'' is currently carried by StarTimes and Wataaa Fight Channel outside of North America, Fight Klub Poland, and MBC in Mauritius.

On July 5, 2022, MLW announced a new broadcast deal with Ayozat TV in the United Kingdom.

See also

List of professional wrestling television series

References

External links
 
 MLW Fusion on beIN Sports

2018 American television series debuts
2020s American television series
American professional wrestling television series
BeIN Sports
Fusion